Conus alexandrei is a species of sea snail, a marine gastropod mollusc in the family Conidae, the cone snails, cone shells or cones.

Description
The size of the shell varies between 30 mm and 46 mm.

Distribution
This marine species occurs off the Philippines, Fiji and Vanuatu

References

 Limpalaër L. & Monnier E. (2012) Phasmoconus alexandrei (Gastropoda: Conidae), a new species from the western Pacific. Visaya 3(5): 21–27.
 Puillandre N., Duda T.F., Meyer C., Olivera B.M. & Bouchet P. (2015). One, four or 100 genera? A new classification of the cone snails. Journal of Molluscan Studies. 81: 1-23

External links
 To World Register of Marine Species
 

alexandrei
Molluscs of the Philippines
Fauna of Fiji
Fauna of Vanuatu
Gastropods described in 2012